Bonconto Commune is a rural community of Bonconto Arrondissement in the Vélingara Department, Kolda Region, Senegal. It is also spelled Bonkonto. The commune is known as a major center of Shia Islam in Senegal and is home to the Al Hassanayni Grand Mosque of Darou Hidjiratou, the largest mosque in the commune.

Darou Hidjiratou is significant as the birthplace of a prominent Shi'i Muslim family in Senegal, which includes the village leader Cherif Habib Aidara (Chérif Habibou Aïdara) and his brother Cherif Mohamed Aly Aidara, founder of the international NGO Mozdahir.

Demographics
Demographics of Bonconto Rural Community:
9,688 persons (year 2010)
5,416 (year 1988)

9 ethnic groups were counted in 2010, with Fulani making up most of the population.
Peul (Fulani) (73%)
Manding (8%)
Bassari (6%)
Bambara (4%)
Remaining ethnic groups: Koniagui, Diola, Mandiack, Diankhanké, Koroboro

Zones and villages
Zones and villages in Bonconto Commune:

Notable people
Darou Hidjiratou is significant as the birthplace of a prominent Shi'i Muslim family in Senegal, including:
Chérif Habibou Aïdara, the local mayor
Cherif Mohamed Aly Aidara, founder of the international NGO Mozdahir (brother of Chérif Habibou Aïdara)

References

Kolda Region
Communes of Senegal